Transit passage is a concept of the law of the sea, which allows a vessel or aircraft the freedom of navigation or overflight solely for the purpose of continuous and expeditious transit of a strait between one part of the high seas or exclusive economic zone and another. The requirement of continuous and expeditious transit does not preclude passage through the strait for the purpose of entering, leaving or returning from a state bordering the strait, subject to the conditions of entry to that state. The transit passage may be exercised regardless of the nationality (flag) of the ship, its form of ownership, the merchant or government status of a ship or warship, the private or government status of an aircraft (under  the Convention on International Civil Aviation of 1944).

Within such straits (article 37 of UNCLOS), including Arctic straits, all ships and aircraft enjoy the right of transit passage (article 38 of UNCLOS), in accordance with Part III of UNCLOS, which means the right of navigation and overflight solely for the purpose of continuous and expeditious transit of the strait between one part of the high seas or an exclusive economic zone and another part of the high seas or an exclusive economic zone. 

This navigation rule is codified in Part III of the United Nations Convention on the Law of the Sea. Although not all countries have ratified the convention, most countries, including the US, accept the customary navigation rules as codified in the Convention. This navigation rule took on more importance with UNCLOS III as that convention confirmed the widening of territorial waters from three to twelve nautical miles, causing more straits not to have a navigation passage between the territorial waters of the coastal nations.

Transit passage exists throughout the entire strait, not just in the area overlapped by the territorial waters of the coastal nations. The ships and aircraft of all nations, including warships, auxiliaries, and military aircraft, enjoy the right of unimpeded transit passage in such straits and their approaches. Submarines are free to transit international straits submerged since that is their normal mode of operation. Transit passage rights do not extend to any state's internal waters within a strait.

The legal regime of transit passage exists for all straits used for international navigation where there is not a simple alternative route, and excluding those instances where there is a long-standing international convention governing the straits, namely the Danish straits, the Turkish straits, the straits of Tiran, the Strait of Magellan and the Beagle Channel. The major international trade routes of the Strait of Gibraltar, Dover Strait, Strait of Hormuz, Bab-el-Mandeb and Strait of Malacca are covered by the transit passage provisions.

In contrast, the artificial maritime canals such as the Corinth Canal are generally not covered by the UNCLOS and fall instead under the respective national laws, with the three notable exceptions of the globally important canals due to their prior treaties: the Kiel Canal, the Panama Canal and the Suez Canal.

See also
Innocent passage
Strait

References

Law of the sea